P. formosa may refer to:

 Parahebe formosa, a plant endemic to Tasmania
 Partula formosa, an extinct snail
 Pempelia formosa, a snout moth
 Phryganopteryx formosa, a Malagasy moth
 Phylloxiphia formosa, an African moth
 Pipreola formosa, a bird endemic to Venezuela
 Pitcairnia formosa, a New World plant
 Pleurotomella formosa, a sea snail
 Poecilia formosa, a freshwater fish